Emily Symons (born 10 August 1969) is an Australian-born actress, active on both Australian and British television. She is known for playing Anne Costello in the short-lived soap opera Richmond Hill in 1988 and when that series ended, from 1989, she started playing Marilyn Chambers-Fisher in Home and Away. After almost ten years in that role, Symons moved to the UK and was immediately cast as Louise Appleton in the British soap Emmerdale. She also took part in the British show Dancing on Ice in 2007. She then returned to Australia in 2010 to reprise her role as Marilyn in Home and Away.

Life and career

Emily Symons's mother remarried when she was just four years old and Symons did not see her biological, English father again until ten years later. She left school before finishing her exams and launched herself into the acting world. For nearly a year, she worked in shops before getting a break in a post office training video.

Her first high-profile role was in Australian soap opera Richmond Hill. After Richmond Hill, Symons auditioned for another Australian drama, Home and Away, where she won the role of Marilyn Chambers whom she played from 1989 until 1992, reprising the role in 1995 until 1999 – with a brief appearance in 2001. She also hosted the Channel 7 music programme Video Smash Hits.

After starring in a string of pantomimes in England, Symons decided to move there. She played the role of barmaid Louise Appleton in the ITV1 soap opera Emmerdale from 2001–2008. She was also a contestant in the 2007 series of Dancing on Ice, but was voted out in the semi-final following a skate off against Blue's Duncan James.

Symons has now returned to Australia permanently, and again resumed playing Home and Away'''s Marilyn Chambers from episode 5035 which aired 19 March 2010 in Australia and has remained ever since .

Personal life
Symons was married to Lorenzo Smith, a son of Viscount Hambleden and descendant of English stationery tycoon W.H. Smith, for two years. Symons said in an interview that her need for children and the resultant cycles of IVF eventually 'killed' the marriage.

She was engaged to footballer Matt Le Tissier. She dated her Emmerdale co-star Matt Healy, who played Matthew King. They broke up just before she took part in "Dancing on Ice"''.

On 3 August 2015, Symons gave birth to her first child with her then partner Paul Jackson.

Filmography

References

External links
 

1969 births
Australian expatriates in the United Kingdom
Australian television actresses
Australian people of English descent
Living people